Kalarsky District  is an administrative and municipal district (raion), one of the thirty-one in Zabaykalsky Krai, Russia. It is located in the north of the krai, and borders with Tungokochensky District in the south. Its administrative center is the rural locality (a selo) of Chara. Population:  9,785 (2002 Census);  The population of Chara accounts for 21.0% of the district's total population.

History
The district was established on September 2, 1938.

Geography
It is the northernmost district of Transbaikalia. The relief is mostly mountainous and includes the Kodar Range, with the highest point of Transbaikalia, Peak BAM, as well as the Udokan Range, Kalar Range and part of the Patom Highlands, among others. There are also vast intermontane basins, and the unique Chara Sands area. On the territory of the region flow many rivers: In the west the Vitim, in the center and the north the Chara river with its tributaries, and in the southern and western parts of the region some Vitim tributaries, such as the Kalar, Konda and Syulban. Among the lakes, the deep Nichatka, the Bolshoye Leprindo and the Leprindokan deserve mention.

References

Notes

Sources

Districts of Zabaykalsky Krai
States and territories established in 1938

